Denis Caputo (born September 21, 1989 in Córdoba, Argentina) is an Argentine footballer currently playing for Universitario de Sucre in the Liga de Futbol Profesional Boliviano.

External links
 
 

1989 births
Living people
Argentine footballers
Argentine expatriate footballers
Racing de Córdoba footballers
Cobresal footballers
Talleres de Córdoba footballers
Expatriate footballers in Chile
Association football midfielders
Footballers from Córdoba, Argentina
Argentine expatriate sportspeople in Chile